The Pasco County Courthouse (constructed in 1909) is a historic site in Dade City, Florida, located at 37918 Meridian Avenue. It was designed by architect Edward Columbus Hosford in the Classical Revival style. On September 20, 2006, it was added to the U.S. National Register of Historic Places.

In recent years, a Valentine's Day tradition has developed where the Pasco County Clerk offers a complimentary wedding ceremony on the steps of the Historic Courthouse.

Gallery

References

External links

 Weekly List Of Actions Taken On Properties: 9/18/06 Through 9/22/06 at National Register of Historic Places
 Pasco County markers at Florida's Office of Cultural and Historical Programs
 Pasco County Courthouse at Florida's Historic Courthouses
 Florida's Historic Courthouses by Hampton Dunn

County courthouses in Florida
Buildings and structures in Pasco County, Florida
Courthouses on the National Register of Historic Places in Florida
Edward Columbus Hosford buildings
Neoclassical architecture in Florida
Clock towers in Florida
Dade City, Florida
National Register of Historic Places in Pasco County, Florida
1909 establishments in Florida
Government buildings completed in 1909